Thomas Hackett may refer to:

Thomas Hackett (Jacobite), Irish Jacobite official and merchant
Thomas C. Hackett (c. 1798–1851), American politician and lawyer
Thomas Hackett (British politician) (1869–1950), British co-operative activist and politician
Thomas Bernard Hackett (1836–1880), Irish recipient of the Victoria Cross

See also
Tom Hackett (born 1992), Australian player of American football